The 1964-65 season saw the 14th competition for the FDGB-Pokal, the East German national football cup.

In a qualification round played on 2 August 1964, the 32 teams of the second-tier DDR-Liga of the past season and 28 finalists of the Bezirkspokal competitions faced each other. Empor Neustrelitz and ASG Vorwärts Neubrandenburg were cup finalists as well as DDR-Liga members. The 14 DDR-Oberliga clubs joined the competition in the second round on 1 November 1964, and BSG Motor Steinach, SG Dynamo Dresden as well as SC Dynamo Berlin were already eliminated there. No Bezirkspokal finalist was left by the third round, and three of the four remaining DDR-Liga sides (ASG Vorwärts Cottbus, ASG Vorwärts Neubrandenburg, Motor Dessau, SC Chemie Halle) were eliminated in the third round. Dessau forced a replay on Chemie Halle, but then lost 0–3.

While last year's finalist SC Leipzig was eliminated in the quarterfinals by SC Motor Jena, title holders Aufbau Magdeburg reached the final again. Two quarter finals were decided on extra time, DDR-Liga side Chemie Halle forced a replay on Oberliga side Motor Zwickau in the quarter final and surprisingly beat Zwickau 2–0. Only in the semi finals was Halle's high stopped.

Qualification round 
Matches played on 2 August 1964.

Replays 

Byes: ASG Vorwärts Cottbus, BSG Stahl Lippendorf

First round 

Match played in Altenburg.

Replay 
(played on 24 September 1964)

Second round 
Matches played on 1 November 1964.

Match played in Waren.

Replays

Third round 
Matches played on 12 December 1964.

Replays

Quarterfinals 
All matches played on 31 March 1965.

Replay
Match played on 7 April 1965.

Semifinals 
Matches played on 2 May 1965.

Final

Statistics

Match report 

The 14th FDGB-Pokal final saw the meeting of holders SC Aufbau Magdeburg and SC Motor Jena, then second in the DDR-Oberliga table. Due to their better league position, most experts favored Jena to win the match, with Magdeburg lying on a mere 7th place. But neither team was willing to adhere to these prognoses. While Magdeburg took the initiative and attacked relentlessly from the start, Jena could not force their usual passing play onto their opponents. Impressed by Magdeburg's offense, Jena withdrew to their own half, looking nervous and hesitating, the number of mistimed passes increasing. On the other side, Magdeburg had many opportunities to score, especially Klingbiel and agile forward Walter put Jena's defense under intense pressure. But all their play was too hasty, some nervousness was felt on Magdeburg's side as well. With the half-time score tied at nil-all, the title holders continued to control the match, with Stöcker gaining scoring opportunities by the minute, but no goal was scored. In the 65th then, Jena surprisingly scored: Lange outplayed Zapf and crossed into the penalty box where Müller hit a direct volley into the far corner. Magdeburg manager Kümmel reacted immediately, putting his right defender Wiedemann into the forward position occupied by Hirschmann and urging his team to keep on attacking. Jena tried to hang on to their narrow lead, but got pushed back into a defensive position again. In the end, Magdeburg were rewarded for their initiative, even though the reward came in the shape of two controversial goals. In the 82nd, Magdeburg's Walter scored off a header after seizing a misunderstanding between Jena's defender Stricksner and their goalkeeper Fritzsche, but most experts held Walter had been offside. In the last minute of the match, Jena's Marx had the bad luck of missing the ball and instead hitting Stöcker's knee inside the penalty area. Hirschmann's low shot off the penalty mark meant Magdeburg's victory. Jena's protest that Marx had indeed played the ball went unheard. While Magdeburg celebrated successfully defending their cup title, Jena bemoaned the referee's and their own performance. Günter Schneider, vice-president of the DFV summed it up: "I am disappointed by this match. Jena can play much better. You have to give Magdeburg their due for their morale. Altogether however, this match was not great advertising for football."

References 

FDGB-Pokal seasons
East
Cup